The Socialist Unity Party (abbreviated SBP) was a political party in Turkey. The party was founded on January 15, 1991. It was headed by Sadun Aren, a former university professor. The party was largely a successor organization of the banned United Communist Party of Turkey (TBKP). SBP held its first party congress in Ankara in May 1992.

The party was banned on July 19, 1995. The remains of the party merged into the United Socialist Party (BSP).

References

1991 establishments in Turkey
1995 disestablishments in Turkey
Banned political parties in Turkey
Banned socialist parties
Defunct socialist parties in Turkey
Political parties established in 1991
Political parties disestablished in 1995